John Kenneth Lawton (6 July 1936 – 12 August 2017) was an English footballer who played in the Football League for Stoke City.

Career
Lawton was born in Woore, and played for Crewe Alexandra before joining Stoke City in 1955. He spent the 1955–56 season at Stoke where he played nine times scoring three goals which came in three straight home league matches against Hull City, Plymouth Argyle and Lincoln City in September 1955. He left at the end of the season and played for his next team Winsford United.

Career statistics

References

1936 births
2017 deaths
Sportspeople from Newcastle-under-Lyme
English footballers
Association football forwards
Stoke City F.C. players
Crewe Alexandra F.C. players
Winsford United F.C. players
English Football League players